Teatralnaya metro station may refer to:
Teatralnaya (Moscow Metro), a station of the Moscow Metro
Teatralnaya metro station (Samara), a station of the Samara Metro, Samara, Russia; planned to open in 2010
Teatralna, name of several metro stations in Ukraine